Sud Quotidien is a major independent daily newspaper in Senegal.

References

External links 
 Official website

Newspapers published in Senegal
Publications with year of establishment missing